Nattakurinji is a raga (musical scale) in Carnatic music. It is an audava janya raga of 28th Melakarta raga Harikambhoji. This raga is good to sing in evenings. It is used rarely in Hindustani, but is very popular in Carnatic music. The raaga Kurinji belongs to the Melakarta family Shankarabharanam but is sung relatively rarely.

Structure and Lakshana 
Nattakurinji is an asymmetric rāgam. It is said to have three types of ascending (arohana) and descending scales (avarohana). In practice all 3 types of arohana and avarohana, as well as other usages (prayogas) are found. Its  structure (one ascending and descending scale) is as follows:

 : 
 : 

The notes used in this scale are shadjam, chathusruthi rishabham, antara gandhara, chathusruthi dhaivatham and kaisiki nishadham in ascending scale, with rishabham excluded in descending scale. For the details of the notations and terms, see swaras in Carnatic music. It is also classified as a "rakti" raga (a raga of high melodic content).

Popular compositions

There are many compositions set to Nattakurinji rāgam. Some of the popular compositions are:
Alli Nodalu Rama, Manava Nillisuvudu, Prananatha paliso nee Enna By Purandara Dasa
Manasu vishaya and Kuvalaya dalanayana composed by Tyagaraja
Chalamela composed by Mulaivittu Rangasami Nattuvanar 
 Gajadhishadanyam, Budham ashrayami, and Parvati kumaram by Muthuswami Dikshitar
Ketum bhajamyaham by Chidambaram Swarnavenkatesha Dikshitar
Mayamma by Shyama Shastri
Pahi Janani Santatam (Navarathri 8th day krithi), Jagadeesha Sada Mamava, Mamava Sada Varade by Swathi Thirunal Rama Varma
Pal vadiyum mugam by Oothukkadu Venkatasubramanya Iyer
Ekkalattilum by Ramaswamy Shivan
Edaunnado by Bhadrachala Ramadasu
 Swami naan undran adimai A Padhavarnam by pabanasamsivan

Film songs

It is to be noted that the song Kannamoochi yenada in the movie Kandukondain Kandukondain is not wholly composed in this ragam. Only the initial portion of the song is composed in Nattakurinji while the latter half is composed in Sahana.

Notes

References

Janya ragas